The 111th Street station is a skip-stop station on the BMT Jamaica Line of the New York City Subway. Located at the intersection of 111th Street and Jamaica Avenue in Richmond Hill, Queens, it is served at all times by the J train. The Z train skips this station when it operates.

History 

This station was opened on May 28, 1917 by the Brooklyn Union Elevated Railroad, an affiliate of the Brooklyn Rapid Transit Company, replacing Cypress Hills as the line's terminus.

The station was temporarily closed on January 14, 2019 for six months of structural repairs. As part of the work, the trackside girders and the platforms were replaced. Unlike the repairs done at 121st Street and 104th Street, which were done one platform at a time, both platforms were closed simultaneously to cut the work from 12 months to 6 months; as a result, the station reopened on June 11, 2019.

Station layout

This elevated station has three tracks and two side platforms. The center track dead ends at bumper blocks on both sides of the station and has connections to both local tracks. It is only used for train storage. It was formerly used to turn trains for the BMT Lexington Avenue Elevated trains from 1917 until 1950. The track was also used to store trains while the Jamaica Line was being torn down north of 121st Street and the Archer Avenue Line was being built.

Both platforms have beige windscreens for their entire lengths and brown canopies with green frames and support columns except for a small section at the west (railroad south) end. Station signs are in the standard black with white lettering.

The 1990 artwork here is called Five Points of Observation by Kathleen McCarthy. It resembles a human face when viewed from the street and is also featured on four other stations on the BMT Jamaica Line.

Exits
The station's only entrance/exit is an elevated station house beneath the tracks. Inside fare control, there is a single staircase to each platform at their south ends and a waiting area that allows a free transfer between directions. Outside fare control, there is a turnstile bank, token booth, and two staircases going down to either eastern corners of Jamaica Avenue and 111th Street.

This station formerly had another entrance/exit at the east (railroad north) end. The staircase to 113th Street was removed, but the elevated station house beneath the tracks and single staircase to each platform remain boarded up and intact. The station house is now used for storage and offices.

References

External links 
 
 111th Street entrance from Google Maps Street View
 Platforms from Google Maps Street View

BMT Jamaica Line stations
1917 establishments in New York City
New York City Subway stations in Queens, New York
Railway stations in the United States opened in 1917
Richmond Hill, Queens